Karang Bolong  (pronounced Ka•Rang-Boh•Lohng) is located on the coast of Anyer, West Java, Indonesia.

The name Karang Bolong means Rock (Karang) with a Hole (Bolong). The mountain was created by frozen lava, formed during the eruption of Mount Krakatau. Karang Bolong beach is located 50 km from Serang town or 140 km from Jakarta, on Karang Bolong Street.

References

Landforms of West Java
Beaches of Indonesia
Tourist attractions in West Java
Landforms of Java